Oak Grove School is a historic one-room school for African-American students located at Winston-Salem and owned by the YWCA of Winston Salem, Forsyth County, North Carolina.  It was built about 1910, and is a one-story, gable-front, in weatherboard clad building with a full-width, shed roof porch.  The school closed about 1950, and was used as a store.  It was restored in 1998.

It was listed on the National Register of Historic Places in 2002.

References

One-room schoolhouses in North Carolina
African-American history in Winston-Salem, North Carolina
School buildings on the National Register of Historic Places in North Carolina
School buildings completed in 1910
Buildings and structures in Winston-Salem, North Carolina
National Register of Historic Places in Winston-Salem, North Carolina